Without the Love may refer to:

"Without the Love", song by China Crisis from Warped by Success 1994
"Without the Love", song by Demi Lovato from Demi 2013